Saül Airport  is an airstrip serving Saül, a commune of French Guiana.

The airport is just southeast of the village. There are low hills west and northeast of the runway. The Saul non-directional beacon (Ident: SU) is located in the village.

Airlines and destinations

Statistics

See also

List of airports in French Guiana
Transport in French Guiana

References

External links
OpenStreetMap - Saül
OurAirports - Saül Airport
SkyVector - Saül Airport

Airports in French Guiana
Saül, French Guiana